George Stephen Vukovich (born June 24, 1956) is a former right fielder in Major League Baseball who played for the Philadelphia Phillies and Cleveland Indians in all or part of six seasons from 1980–1985. Listed at 6' 0" , 198 lb. , Vukovich batted left handed and threw right handed. He was born in Chicago.

Vukovich attended college at Southern Illinois University, where he was a member of Phi Sigma Kappa fraternity. The Phillies selected him in the fourth round of the 1977 MLB draft out of SIU.

Vukovich made his major league debut with the Phillies in 1980, appearing as a pinch hitter in a game against the Montreal Expos. He received a World Series ring in his rookie season, even though he did not play in the Series.

In 1981, Vukovich hit a game-winning home run against the Montreal Expos in Game 4 of the National League Division Series. It remains the only walk-off home run in Phillies playoff history.

In December 1982, Vukovich was sent along with Jay Baller, Julio Franco, Manny Trillo and Jerry Willard to the Indians in the same transaction that brought Von Hayes to Philadelphia. Afterwards, he played two seasons in Japan for the Seibu Lions from 1986 to 1987.

In between, Vukovich played winter ball with the Águilas del Zulia of the Venezuelan League during three seasons spanning 1979–1982. He later made a brief appearance for the Daytona Beach Explorers of the Senior Professional Baseball Association in 1991.

References

External links
 
Appeared as a guest on BaD Radio on KTCK Sports Radio 1310/96.7 in Dallas/Fort Worth on March 3, 2014 as part of the Dan McDowell Birthday Show

1956 births
Living people
Águilas del Zulia players
American expatriate baseball players in Venezuela
American expatriate baseball players in Japan
American people of Serbian descent
Auburn Phillies players
Baseball players from Chicago
Cleveland Indians players
Daytona Beach Explorers players
Major League Baseball right fielders
Oklahoma City 89ers players
Peninsula Pilots players
Philadelphia Phillies players
Reading Phillies players
Southern Illinois Salukis baseball players
Seibu Lions players
Toledo Mud Hens players